Per Gjelten (December 5, 1927 – January 25, 1991) was a Norwegian nordic skier who competed in the early 1950s. He finished fourth in the nordic combined event at the 1954 FIS Nordic World Ski Championships in Falun and fifth in the same event at the 1952 Winter Olympics in Oslo.

Also in Oslo, he finished 20th in the 18 km cross-country skiing event.

Cross-country skiing results
All results are sourced from the International Ski Federation (FIS).

Olympic Games

World Championships

References

External links
18 km Olympic cross country results: 1948-52

Nordic combined skiers at the 1952 Winter Olympics
Cross-country skiers at the 1952 Winter Olympics
Norwegian male cross-country skiers
Olympic cross-country skiers of Norway
Norwegian male Nordic combined skiers
Olympic Nordic combined skiers of Norway
1991 deaths
1927 births
20th-century Norwegian people